Rio Grande High School is a public high school located in South Valley, New Mexico, United States, with an Albuquerque postal address. It is part of the Albuquerque Public Schools system.

Athletics
RGHS competes in the New Mexico Activities Association (NMAA), as a class 6A school in District 5. In 2014, the NMAA realigned the state's schools in to six classifications and adjusted district boundaries.  Other schools in District 5-6A include West Mesa High School, Albuquerque High School, Valley High School and Atrisco Heritage Academy High School.

The Ravens have talented baseball and wrestling teams. The wrestlers have placed second in state in recent years.

Notable alumni
 Shelia Burrell (class of 1990), Olympic heptathlete
 Ken Giles - pitcher for the San Francisco Giants
 Greg Jackson - Head Coach and strategist for his Submission Fighting and mixed martial art camp

References

Educational institutions established in 1959
High schools in Albuquerque, New Mexico
Public high schools in New Mexico
1959 establishments in New Mexico